The United Kingdom participated in the Eurovision Song Contest 2009 with the song "It's My Time" written by Andrew Lloyd Webber and Diane Warren. The song was performed by Jade Ewen. The British entry for the 2009 contest in Moscow, Russia was selected via the national final Eurovision: Your Country Needs You, organised by the British broadcaster BBC. Six acts competed in the national final which consisted of two heats, a semi-final and a final, during which the winner was selected entirely through a public televote.

As a member of the "Big Four", the United Kingdom automatically qualified to compete in the final of the Eurovision Song Contest. Performing in position 23, the United Kingdom placed 5th out of the 25 participating countries with 173 points.

Background
Prior to the 2009 contest, the United Kingdom has participated in the Eurovision Song Contest fifty-one times. Thus far, the United Kingdom has won the contest five times: in 1967 with the song "Puppet on a String" performed by Sandie Shaw, in 1969 with the song "Boom Bang-a-Bang" performed by Lulu, in 1976 with the song "Save Your Kisses for Me" performed by Brotherhood of Man, in 1981 with the song "Making Your Mind Up" performed by Bucks Fizz and in 1997 with the song "Love Shine a Light" performed by Katrina and the Waves. To this point, the nation is noted for having finished as the runner-up in a record fifteen contests. Up to and including 1998, the UK had only twice finished outside the top 10, in 1978 and 1987. Since 1999, the year in which the rule was abandoned that songs must be performed in one of the official languages of the country participating, the UK has had less success, thus far only finishing within the top ten once: in 2002 with the song "Come Back" performed by Jessica Garlick. For the 2008 contest, the United Kingdom finished in twenty-fifth place (last) out of twenty-five competing entries with the song "Even If" performed by Andy Abraham.

The British national broadcaster, BBC, broadcasts the event within the United Kingdom and organises the selection process for the nation's entry. Despite calls from the leader of the Conservative Party David Cameron for a withdrawal due to the 2008 South Ossetia war, BBC announced that the United Kingdom would participate in the Eurovision Song Contest 2009 on 28 May 2008. BBC has traditionally organised a national final featuring a competition among several artists and songs to choose the British entry for Eurovision. For their 2009 entry, the broadcaster announced that a national final involving a public vote would be held to select United Kingdom's entry.

Before Eurovision

Eurovision: Your Country Needs You 2009 

Eurovision: Your Country Needs You 2009 was the national final developed by the BBC in order to select the British entry for the Eurovision Song Contest 2009. Six acts competed over four televised shows between 10 and 31 January 2009 held at the BBC Television Centre in London and hosted by Graham Norton. All shows in the national final were broadcast on BBC One as well as streamed online via the broadcaster's website bbc.co.uk.

Contestants 
On 18 October 2008, BBC announced an open application for interested artists to submit their applications in the form of a video recording of themselves performing a cover version of a popular song or a self-written song. Eligible artists were those being 17 years old by 1 January 2009 and living in a country within the European Economic Area. The application period lasted until 21 November 2008. All applicants were presented to a professional panel consisting of Andrew Lloyd Webber (composer of the British song) and Colin Barlow (record company executive) that ultimately selected six artists to compete in the national final. An introduction show was broadcast on 3 January 2009 which involved the background preparation processes of the national final. The six contestants were also announced during the show: Charlotte Finlay, Damien Flood, Emperors of Soul, Francine and Nicola Gleadall, Jade Ewen and Mark Evans.

Results summary
Colour key
 Act received the most public votes
 Act was in the "danger zone" but saved by Andrew Lloyd Webber
 Act was eliminated by Andrew Lloyd Webber

Shows

Introduction show (3 January 2009)
The introduction show was aired on 3 January 2009. The show involved the background preparation processes including the selection of the six contestants and the visitation of Norton and Lloyd Webber to Russia (at the venue of the Eurovision Song Contest 2009 Olimpiysky Arena), Poland and Hungary. The show also included meetings and interviews with the Russian Prime Minister Vladimir Putin and previous Eurovision Song Contest winner Dima Bilan, who won the contest for Russia in 2008 with the song "Believe", and several Russian Eurovision fans who suggested that the United Kingdom should avoid amateur artists and focus on a more professional approach to the contest.  Back in Britain, Lloyd Webber teamed up with record company executive Colin Barlow, who has worked with the likes of Take That and Girls Aloud, having had 15 number ones and sold over 40 million albums as a producer, to help select the lucky six performers who will progress to the live shows. After seeing a number of entries sent into the BBC by the people, getting a "fabulous look at people's living rooms" as Norton said, we got a sense of who may be the future qualifiers to the live shows. After a number of auditions and workshops, showing some potential qualifiers rehearsing at their homes and elsewhere, the final six qualifiers were finally introduced.

Heat 1 (10 January 2009) 
Six acts competed in the first heat on 10 January 2009. All contestants were also accompanied by a 17-piece band during their performances. In addition to their performances, the female contestants performed "One Rock & Roll Too Many" from Lloyd Webber's musical Starlight Express, while the male contestants performed the song "No Matter What" by Boyzone. Guest performer was Lemar performing the song "Weight of the World" from his latest album The Reason.

A panel of experts provided feedback alongside Lloyd Webber regarding the performances during the show. The panel consisted of Lulu (Eurovision Song Contest winner for the United Kingdom in 1969 with "Boom Bang-a-Bang") and Arlene Phillips (choreographer, talent scout and television presenter). A public televote saved four of the contestants from the "danger zone", while Lloyd Webber saved Charlotte Finlay and eliminated Damien Flood.

Heat 2 (17 January 2009) 
The five remaining acts competed in the second heat on 17 January 2009. All contestants were also accompanied by a 17-piece band during their performances. In addition to their performances, the female contestants performed the song "Rhythm of the Night" by DeBarge, while the male contestants performed the song "Nothing's Gonna Stop Us Now" by Starship. The contestants together also performed the winning song for the United Kingdom in 1976 "Save Your Kisses for Me" by Brotherhood of Man. Guest performer was the group The Saturdays performing the song "Up" from their latest album.

A panel of experts provided feedback alongside Lloyd Webber regarding the performances during the show. The panel consisted of Lulu and Duncan James (singer, actor and member of Blue). A public televote saved three of the contestants from the "danger zone", while Lloyd Webber saved Emperors of Soul and eliminated Charlotte Finlay.

Semi-final (24 January 2009) 
The four remaining acts competed in the semi-final on 24 January 2009. All contestants were also accompanied by a 17-piece band during their performances. In addition to their performances, the female contestants performed the song "I'll Stand by You" by The Pretenders, while the male contestants performed the song "Don't Let the Sun Go Down on Me" by Elton John. Guest performers were Lulu performing the winning song for the United Kingdom in 1969 "Boom Bang-a-Bang", and Alesha Dixon performing the song "Breathe Slow".

A panel of experts provided feedback alongside Lloyd Webber regarding the performances during the show. The panel consisted of Dixon and Emma Bunton (singer-songwriter and actress). The contestants each performed two songs: a ballad and an up-tempo song. A public televote saved two of the contestants from the "danger zone", while Lloyd Webber saved Jade Ewen and eliminated Emperors of Soul.

Final
The three remaining acts competed in the final on 31 January 2009. In addition to their performances, the contestants performed the winning song for the United Kingdom in 1981 "Making Your Mind Up" by Bucks Fizz in a group. Guest performers included Lulu performing the song "Relight My Fire" by Dan Hartman with the eliminated contestants Damien Flood, Charlotte Finlay and Emperors of Soul, and previous Eurovision Song Contest winner Dima Bilan who won the contest for Russia in 2008 with the song "Believe".

A panel of experts provided feedback alongside Lloyd Webber regarding the performances during the show. The panel consisted of previous panellists Lulu and James. The contestants each performed three songs, including a previously performed song during the preceding three heats and the British song "It's My Time". A public televote selected Jade Ewen as the winning artist.

Ratings

Promotion 
Jade Ewen made several appearances across Europe to specifically promote "It's My Time" as the British Eurovision entry. On 7 February, Jade Ewen performed "It's My Time" during the final of the Maltese Eurovision national final. She also performed the song between 18 February and 7 March during the Greek Eurovision national final, the presentation show of the 2009 Bosnian Eurovision entry, and the Russian and Ukrainian Eurovision national finals. On 18 April, Ewen performed during the Eurovision in Concert event which was held at the Amsterdam Marcanti venue in Amsterdam, Netherlands and hosted by Marga Bult and Maggie MacNeal, and appeared during the RTL 4 programme Life and Cooking. On 3 May, Ewen performed "It's My Time" during Taniec z Gwiazdami, the Polish version of Strictly Come Dancing. Prior to the contest, Ewen was interview by Russian magazine OK! which gave away copies of "It's My Time".

In addition to their international appearances, on 17 May, Jade Ewen performed during the UK Eurovision Preview Party, which was held in London, United Kingdom and hosted by Nicki French and Paddy O'Connell. On 1, 2 and 4 May, Ewen appeared on the BBC One programmes Friday Night with Jonathan Ross, Saturday Kitchen and The One Show, respectively.

At Eurovision

According to Eurovision rules, all nations with the exceptions of the host country and the "Big Four" (France, Germany, Spain and the United Kingdom) are required to qualify from one of two semi-finals in order to compete for the final; the top nine songs from each semi-final as determined by televoting progress to the final, and a tenth was determined by back-up juries. As a member of the "Big Four", the United Kingdom automatically qualified to compete in the final on 16 May 2009. In addition to their participation in the final, France is also required to broadcast and vote in one of the two semi-finals. During the semi-final allocation draw on 30 January 2009, the United Kingdom was assigned to broadcast and vote in the first semi-final on 12 May 2009.

In the United Kingdom, the semi-finals were broadcast on BBC Three with commentary by Paddy O'Connell and Sarah Cawood, while the final was televised on BBC One with commentary by Graham Norton and broadcast on BBC Radio 2 with commentary by Ken Bruce. Norton replaced Terry Wogan following his retirement as the British commentator since 1980. The British spokesperson, who announced the British votes during the final, was Duncan James.

Final 
Jade Ewen took part in technical rehearsals on 9 and 10 May, followed by dress rehearsals on 15 and 16 May. This included the jury final on 15 May where the professional juries of each country watched and voted on the competing entries. The running order for the semi-finals and final was decided by through another draw on 16 March 2009 and the United Kingdom was subsequently placed to perform in position 23, following the entry from Romania and before the entry from Finland.

The British performance featured Jade Ewen on stage with the LED screens displaying white chandeliers. Ewen made her entrance on a staircase in the middle of the stage with four violinists dressed in black tailcoats and bow ties, and was later joined by the co-composer of "It's My Time" Andrew Lloyd Webber who played the piano. The singer wore a dress designed by designer Amanda Wakeley during the performance, which was choreographed by Arlene Philips. The performance also featured smoke effects. The United Kingdom placed fifth in the final, scoring 173 points.

Voting 
The voting system for 2009 involved each country awarding points from 1-8, 10 and 12, with the points in the final being decided by a combination of 50% national jury and 50% televoting. Each nation's jury consisted of five music industry professionals who are citizens of the country they represent. This jury judged each entry based on: vocal capacity; the stage performance; the song's composition and originality; and the overall impression by the act. In addition, no member of a national jury was permitted to be related in any way to any of the competing acts in such a way that they cannot vote impartially and independently.

Following the release of the full split voting by the EBU after the conclusion of the competition, it was revealed that the United Kingdom had placed tenth with the public televote and third with the jury vote in the final. In the public vote, the United Kingdom scored 105 points, while with the jury vote, the United Kingdom scored 223 points.

Below is a breakdown of points awarded to the United Kingdom and awarded by the United Kingdom in the second semi-final and grand final of the contest, and the breakdown of the jury voting and televoting conducted during the two shows:

Points awarded to the United Kingdom

Points awarded by the United Kingdom

Detailed voting results
The following members comprised the British jury:

 Jasmine Dotiwala
 Paul Goodey
 Steve Allen
 Zoe Martlew
 Keith Hughes

References

External links

2009
Countries in the Eurovision Song Contest 2009
Eurovision
Eurovision